The 2020 Netherlands Quadrangular Series was a cricket tournament that was scheduled to take place in June 2020 in the Netherlands. The series would have been played between the Netherlands, Namibia, Oman and the United States, with all the matches played as One Day Internationals (ODIs). However, on 22 April 2020, the Dutch government announced that it had banned all events in the country, both sports and cultural, until 1 September 2020 due to the COVID-19 pandemic.

References

Netherlands Quadrangular Series
Netherlands Quadrangular Series
Netherlands Quadrangular Series
Netherlands Quadrangular Series
Netherlands Quadrangular Series
International cricket competitions in the Netherlands
Netherlands Quadrangular Series
Netherlands Quadrangular Series